Stoloteuthis leucoptera, also known as the butterfly bobtail squid, is a widespread species of bobtail squid. Its natural range covers the Atlantic Ocean, Mediterranean Sea, and southwestern Indian Ocean. It is distributed from the Gulf of St Lawrence to the Straits of Florida in the western Atlantic and in the Bay of Biscay in the eastern Atlantic. In the Mediterranean Sea, it is specifically found in the northern and southern Tyrrhenian Sea, Ligurian Sea, and off Gorgona Island. S. leucoptera has also been recorded from the Benguela Current off Namibia. There exist unverified records of specimens off eastern Tasmania.

On average, females are slightly larger than males. They grow to 18 mm and 17 mm in mantle length, respectively.

References

External links 

 Tree of Life web project: Stoloteuthis leucoptera

Bobtail squid
Molluscs described in 1878
Marine molluscs of Europe
Cephalopods of Europe